Amrapali Gan is an Indian-American businesswoman. In December 2021, she was appointed as CEO of OnlyFans, which she joined in September 2020 as chief marketing and communications officer. She succeeded founding CEO Tim Stokely.

She has previously worked for Red Bull and Quest Nutrition, and was VP of Cannabis Cafe.

Early life 

Gan was born in Mumbai, Maharashtra, India in 1984 or 1985.  She is a graduate of California State University, Los Angeles.

References

External links 

 

Living people
Marketing people
American chief executives
21st-century American businesswomen
21st-century American businesspeople
Indian emigrants to the United States
Date of birth missing (living people)
People from Mumbai
California State University, Los Angeles alumni
Year of birth missing (living people)